Alias Mary Smith is a 1932 American mystery crime film directed by E. Mason Hopper and starring Blanche Mehaffey, John Darrow and Raymond Hatton. It was released by the independent company Mayfair Pictures.

Synopsis
A young woman known by her alias Mary Smith, falls in love with a wealthy young man despite his father's disapproval. Unbeknown to them she is the sister of a man executed after being framed by gangster Snowy Hoagland for a crime he didn't commit. Seeking revenge on him, she becomes entangled in the murder of a district attorney.

Cast
 Blanche Mehaffey as Joan 
 John Darrow as 	Buddy
 Raymond Hatton as Scoop
 Edmund Breese as Father
 Myrtle Stedman as 	Mother
 Gwen Lee as Blossom
 Henry B. Walthall as 	Attwell
 Alec B. Francis as Lawyer
 Matthew Betz as	Snowy
 Jack Grey as 	Kearney
 Harry Strang as Yeager
 Ben Hall as Jake
 Lionel Backus as 	Hood 
 Jack Cheatham as 	Cop 
 George Chesebro as Mac

References

Bibliography
 Langman, Larry & Finn, Daniel. A Guide to American Crime Films of the Thirties. Greenwood Press, 1995.
 Pitts, Michael R. Poverty Row Studios, 1929–1940. McFarland & Company, 2005.

External links
 

1932 films
1932 crime films
1932 mystery films
American mystery films
American crime films
Films directed by E. Mason Hopper
American black-and-white films
Mayfair Pictures films
1930s English-language films
1930s American films